Clement Maosa (born 9 May 1988) is a DJ, South African actor, most famous for playing the role of Zamokuhle Seakamela in the SABC1 soap opera, Skeem Saam.

Early life and education
He is from Polokwane, Limpopo. He attended schools in South Africa in a village called Ga-Rammutla and studied law at the University of Limpopo.

When Clement was young he wanted to be a Soldier, but when he reached high school he decided he would be an actor. He grew up in Bochum with his parents, two sisters and a younger brother.

Career
Clement's career highlights include the month he served his articles as a candidate attorney, some road shows and promotions with a commercial radio station in Limpopo and when he was registered as a model with Rezo-Lution and Media Management. He has recently shared a stage with DJ Bongz and other South African stars where his skills in dancing were exposed. He is also known for hosting birthday extravaganza parties where South African celebrities converge and enjoy themselves. 2016, was his second time organising it.

His involvement with Skeem Saam was his big break. "I saw a notification on Facebook from Mzansi fo sho about the auditions. I travelled from Limpopo to audition and fortunately I got the role".

Filmography
 Skeem Saam

References

1988 births
Living people
South African male actors
People from Polokwane